William John Lane (born August 1849) was an Irish nationalist politician. A member of Cork Corporation in 1884, he was elected at the 1885 general election as the Member of Parliament (MP) for the newly created Eastern division of County Cork. Lane was re-elected unopposed in 1886, but did not stand again at the 1892 general election. He was a member of the Irish Parliamentary Party until 1891 when he sided with the Anti-Parnellite majority, joining the Irish National Federation.

He was married to an American, Frances Mary Armstrong of Brooklyn, New York City.

References

External links 
 

1849 births
Year of death unknown
Members of the Parliament of the United Kingdom for County Cork constituencies (1801–1922)
UK MPs 1885–1886
UK MPs 1886–1892
Irish Parliamentary Party MPs
Anti-Parnellite MPs
Local councillors in County Cork